The Gulf of Bothnia is divided into the Bothnian Bay and Bothnian Sea, and it is the northernmost arm of the Baltic Sea, between Finland's west coast (East Bothnia) and the Sweden's east coast (West Bothnia and North Bothnia). In the south of the gulf lies Åland, between the Sea of Åland and the Archipelago Sea.

Name
Bothnia is a latinization. The Swedish name  was originally just , with  being Old Norse for "gulf" or "bay", which is also the meaning of the second element .

Later,  was applied to the regions  on the western side and  the eastern side ('West Bottom' and 'East Bottom'). The Finnish name of Österbotten,  (meaning 'land'), gives a hint as to the meaning in both languages: the meaning of  includes both 'bottom' and 'north'.  is the base word for north, with an adjectival suffix added.

/ is cognate with the English word bottom, and it might be part of a general north European distinction of lowlands, as opposed to highlands, such as the Netherlandic region, Samogitia (Lithuanian), and Sambia (Russia).

A second possibility is that  follows an alternative Scandinavian connotation of 'furthermost'. Thus, the Gulf of Bothnia would be the farthest extent of the Ocean.

The original meaning of English north, from Proto-Indo-European  'under', indicates an original sense of 'lowlands' for bottomlands. On the other hand, by north the classical authors usually meant 'outermost', as the northern lands were outermost to them.

In Saami, the cardinal directions were named according to the different parts of the typical tent used by this nomadic people. The door of the tent was traditionally pointed south, in the most sunny direction, and the bottom of the tent would be aligned with the north. Thus the origin of the word  in its use as 'north'. According to Lönnrot, north was viewed as the bottom direction because the lowest point of the sun's path is there.

Geography
The International Hydrographic Organization defines the southern limit of the Gulf of Bothnia as follows:
From Simpnäsklubb (59°54'N) in Sweden, to Flötjan, Lagskær [sic], Fæstörne [sic], Kökarsörn, and Vænö-Kalkskær [sic] to the SW point of Hangöudde (Hangö Head, 59°49'N) in Finland, thus including Åland and adjacent shoals and channels in the Gulf of Bothnia.

The gulf is 725 km (450 mi) long, 80–240 km (50-150 mi) wide and has an average depth of 60 m (200 ft, 33 fathoms). The maximum depth is 295 m (965 ft, 161 fathoms). The surface area is 117,000 km² (45,200 sq mi). The northernmost point is situated in Töre in the Bothnian Bay. its coordinates are 65° 54'07" N 22° 39'00 E.

The depth and surface area of the Gulf of Bothnia are constantly decreasing, as the land is rising after it had been pressed down by about 2,600 to 3,300 feet (800 to 1,000 meters) by the continental ice during last ice age.  The rise is 80 cm every hundred years. It is estimated that the land has a further 300 to 400 feet (100 to 125 meters) to rise before equilibrium is reached. This recovery rate will progressively slow as isostatic equilibrium is approached.

Into the gulf flow a number of rivers from both sides; consequently, a salinity gradient exists from north to south.
In the south the water is the normal brackish water of the Baltic Sea, but in the north, in the Bothnian Bay, the salinity is so low, from 0.4% near Kvarken to 0.2% in the northernmost part, that many freshwater fish such as the pike, whitefish and perch thrive in it.

Within 2000 years the bay is expected to separate from the rest of the gulf and become a freshwater lake.

Being nearly fresh, the gulf is frozen over five months every year. The icing of the Baltic Sea begins and ends in the northern Gulf of Bothnia. Traffic restrictions for icebreaker assistance are typically in force for all the gulf from late January to late April and for the northernmost ports from the middle of December to the middle of May.

Geology

Geologically the Gulf of Bothnia is an ancient depression of tectonic origin. The depression is partly filled with sedimentary rock deposited in the Precambrian and Paleozoic. Nearby plains adjoining the gulf are part of the Sub-Cambrian peneplain. While being repeatedly covered by glaciers during the last 2.5 million years glacial erosion has had a limited effect in changing the topography.

Ongoing post-glacial rebound is thought to result in splitting of the Gulf of Bothnia into a southern gulf and northern lake across the Norra Kvarken area in not less time than about 2,000 years.

History
Some historians suggest that the adventurer Ottar was referring to the Gulf of Bothnia when he spoke of the Kven Sea in the 9th century. It is also possible that Claudius Clavus's usage of the term  in the 15th century refers to the Gulf of Bothnia.

Economy
The land surrounding the Gulf of Bothnia is heavily forested. Trees are logged, then transported to the coast for milling. The gulf is also important for oil transport to the coastal cities and ore transport to steel mills, for instance in Raahe.

In terms of tonnage in international traffic, the largest ports on the Finnish side are Rauma, Kokkola and Tornio. The main ports of the Swedish side are in Luleå, Skellefteå, Umeå, Sundsvall, Gävle and Hargshamn. In Luleå, iron ore pellets are exported and coal is imported. Gävle is Sweden's third-largest container port. It also ships forest products and oil. In port operations in the Gulf of Bothnia, icebreaker assistance can be required for an ice season that averages as long as six months; whereas in the Gulf of Finland, the icebreaking season averages only three months.

There is some fishery, mainly Baltic herring, for domestic needs. A persistent problem has been pollution, because the sea is enclosed by a large drainage basin and is poorly connected to fresher waters from the Atlantic. Mercury and PCB levels have been relatively high, although the Finnish Food Safety Authority considers the herring edible. Although the levels exceed the limits, the fatty acids have health benefits that offset this risk.

Rivers

Kalajoki
Kemijoki
Kiiminkijoki
Kokemäenjoki
Oulujoki
Dalälven
Ljusnan
Ljungan
Indalsälven
Ångerman
Ume River
Skellefte River
Pite River
Lule River
Kalix River
Torne

Cities and towns

Gävle
Härnösand
Jakobstad
Kalajoki
Kokkola
Kristinestad
Luleå
Oulu
Pori
Rauma
Sundsvall
Umeå
Vaasa

References

External links 

 
Baltic Sea
Bothnia
Bays of Finland
Gulfs of Sweden
Geography of Northern Europe
Geography of Scandinavia
Finland–Sweden border
Landforms of Norrbotten County
Landforms of Västerbotten County
Landforms of Västernorrland County
Landforms of Gävleborg County
Mesoproterozoic rifts and grabens